Cristián Barros Melet (born 9 October 1952) is a Chilean diplomat who was the Permanent Representative of Chile to the United Nations in New York since 16 April 2014 to 2018. He also served as Ambassador to India (2010–14), Italy (2008–10), Peru (2006–08), United Kingdom (2000–02) and Denmark (1993–96). He also served as Undersecretary for Foreign Affairs (2002–06) in the government of Ricardo Lagos.

Biography
Born in Santiago de Chile, Barros was educated at Saint Gabriel's School. After graduating from Law at the University of Chile in Santiago, Barros also attended the Andrés Bello Diplomatic Academy in 1973. In 1974 he entered the Foreign Service Consular Directorate. From 1978 he served in the Administration Office of the Ministry of Foreign Affairs until 1979. In 1979 he took his first diplomatic posting as Deputy Consul in Mendoza, Argentina. In 1980 he was posted as consul in Bariloche, Argentina. Between 1983 and 1985 he worked in the American Division of the Department of Bilateral Policy. In 1985 he was appointed Chile's Consul-General in Chicago, United States until 1988. From 1989 to 1990 he was First Secretary in the Embassy of Chile in Canada, when he became Chief of Staff to the Director General of Foreign Policy.

In 1991 he was appointed as Director of Personnel and between 1992 and 1993 served as Chief Administrative Officer of the Ministry. In 1993 he was appointed as Ambassador to Denmark, serving until 1996. From 1996 to 1998 he was Administrative Director of the Ministry and from 1998 to 1999 took over as Director General of Foreign Policy. From 2000 to 2002 he was Ambassador to the United Kingdom, with accreditation to Ireland. In 2002 he was appointed by President Ricardo Lagos as Undersecretary for Foreign Affairs, serving until 2006. From 2006 to 2008 he served as Ambassador to Peru and from 2008 to 2010 was ambassador to Italy, with accreditation to Malta. While in Italy he also sat as Chile's Permanent Representative to the Food and Agriculture Organization. In 2010 he was appointed Ambassador to India, with accreditation to Sri Lanka, Bangladesh and Nepal. In 2014, Barros was appointed to succeed Octavio Errázuriz as Permanent Representative of Chile to the United Nations and presented his credentials to Secretary-General Ban Ki-moon on 16 April 2014. Barros was President of the United Nations Security Council in January 2015.

Honours
  1993: Grand Cross of the Order of Merit of Portugal.
  1996: Grand Cross of the Order of the Dannebrog (Denmark).
  1998: Grand Cross of the Order of May (Argentina).
  1999: Grand Cross of the National Order of Merit (Brazil).
  1999: Grand Cross of the Order of the Sun of Peru. 
  2003: Knight Grand Cross of the Order of Orange-Nassau (Netherlands).
  2004: Knight Grand Cross of the Order of Isabella the Catholic (Spain).
  2004: Grand Cross of the Order of the Liberator General San Martin (Argentina).
  2004: Grand Officer of the Order of Ouissam Alaouite (Morocco).
  2005: Member (1st Class) of the Order of Service Merit (Korea)
  2006: Grand Cross of the Order of Vasco Núñez de Balboa (Panama).

External links

References

1952 births
Chilean diplomats
Ambassadors of Chile to India
Ambassadors of Chile to Italy
Ambassadors of Chile to Peru
Ambassadors of Chile to the United Kingdom
Grand Crosses of the Order of the Dannebrog
Grand Crosses of the Order of the Liberator General San Martin
Grand Crosses of the Order of Merit (Portugal)
Grand Crosses of the Order of the Sun of Peru
Knights Grand Cross of the Order of Isabella the Catholic
Knights Grand Cross of the Order of Orange-Nassau
People from Santiago
Permanent Representatives of Chile to the United Nations
University of Chile alumni
Living people
Ambassadors of Chile to Denmark
Ambassadors of Chile to Malta
Ambassadors of Chile to Ireland
Representatives of Chile to the Food and Agriculture Organization
Ambassadors of Chile to Sri Lanka
Ambassadors of Chile to Nepal
Recipients of the National Order of Merit (Brazil)